Ironi Rosh HaAyin is a professional beach soccer team based in Rosh HaAyin, Israel. The club was founded by Eran Aviv in 2004 as a Futsal team in the Israeli Futsal League and in 2007 as a beach soccer team as part of  the Israeli Beach Soccer League. Rosh HaAyin has won one championship (2011) and at the international level it has one Euro Winners Challenge (2022) and one Capital Cup (2008).

International historical results

Squads

2019 Israeli Beach Soccer League squad

Coach:  Dor Levi

2022 Euro Winners Cup squad

Coach:  Tzahi Ilos

Honours

International competitions
Euro Winners Challenge
 Winners (1): 2022

Capital Cup
 Winners (1): 2008

National competitions
Israeli Beach Soccer League
 Winners (1): 2011

References

Israeli beach soccer teams